Skyroads may refer to:

Skyroads (band), a Tel Aviv, Israel based Electronic Pop-Rock band.
Skyroads (comics), a 1920s comic strip about aviation.
SkyRoads (video game), a 1993 video game.